The Songchenglu railway station is a railway station on the Zhengzhou–Kaifeng intercity railway. The station is located on the south side of Songcheng Road, Kaifeng, Henan, China.

The station currently serves as the eastern terminus of the Zhengzhou–Kaifeng intercity railway. The under-construction phase II project will extend the railway from this station to Kaifeng railway station.

References

Railway stations in Henan
Stations on the Zhengzhou–Kaifeng Intercity Railway
Railway stations in China opened in 2014